An autospore is a non-motile (non-flagellated) aplanospore that is produced within a parent cell, and has the same shape as the parent cell, before release. Autospores, in addition to zoospore and aplanospore, are one of the three types of spores that algae use to reproduce and spread asexually.  Autospores occur in several groups of algae, including Eustigmatophyceae, Dinoflagellates and green algae. For example, the colonial alga Dichotomococcus produces two autospores per reproducing cell; the autospores escape through a slit in the cell wall and remain attached to the mother cell.

Autospore Formation 

An autospore is defined one of the daughter cells formed by the internal division of a single cell. Autospores are formed as a result of fission in the mitotic phase of cell division of green algae. There are multiple methods that a cell can take to form autospores. The cell can undergo a multiple fission after 2 nuclear divisions where 4 autospores will form which is the preferred mechanism in organisms such as P. subcapitata. In addition to this mechanism, there is binary fission (the split into 2 autospores) also known as the "two-autospore type" and the "eight-autospore type". There are two stages of autospore formation. There is moderate synthesis during the process of cell growth. During the cell division stage, there is rapid synthesis. After being released from the cell's autosporangium, the cell will begin to synthesis a new daughter cell.

Notes

Bibliography 
Yamagishi T, Yamaguchi H, Suzuki S, Horie Y, Tatarazako N (2017) Cell reproductive patterns in the green alga Pseudokirchneriella subcapitata (=Selenastrum capricornutum) and their variations under exposure to the typical toxicants potassium dichromate and 3,5-DCP. PLoS ONE 12(2): e0171259. doi:10.1371/journal. pone.0171259

Autospore | Definition of Autospore by Merriam-Webster.

Yamamoto, M. (Tokyo Univ. (Japan)) ; Fujishita, M ; Hirata, A ; Kawano, S: Journal of plant research, 2004-08, Vol.117 (4), p.257-264

Gärtner, Georg ; Stoyneva, Maya P ; Uzunov, Blagoy A ; Mancheva, Antonia D ; Ingolić, Elisabeth: Fottea (Praha), 2012-09-01, Vol.12 (2), p.273-280
Green algae
Dinoflagellate biology
Fungal morphology and anatomy
Germ cells